The following surface transit routes in the Baltimore Metropolitan Area have been numbered 9:
 No. 9 Halethorpe Streetcar, 1900–1926, now Route 35 (MTA Maryland) bus service
Ellicott City Line, 1927 to 1957
Route 9 (Baltimore 1971-1973) to Fort Howard, part of Route 4 until 1993
Route 9 (MTA Maryland), 1974 to 2000 and 2005 to present